Justice Bryan may refer to:

Charles Henry Bryan (1822–1877), associate justice of the Supreme Court of California
George Bryan (1731–1791), judge of the Colonial Pennsylvania Supreme Court
Tommy Bryan (born 1956), associate justice of the Supreme Court of Alabama
William Shepard Bryan (1827–1906), associate justice of the Maryland Court of Appeals

See also
Judge Bryan (disambiguation)